Eliani "Lica" Miranda da Costa (born ) was a Brazilian female volleyball player.

She was part of the Brazil women's national volleyball team at the 1984 Summer Olympics and the 1988 Summer Olympics. She also competed at the 1986 FIVB Volleyball Women's World Championship.

References

External links
http://www.todor66.com/volleyball/America/Women_PG_1987.html
http://www.fivb.org/en/volleyball/viewPressRelease.asp?No=62161&Language=en

1969 births
Living people
Brazilian women's volleyball players
Place of birth missing (living people)
Volleyball players at the 1984 Summer Olympics
Volleyball players at the 1988 Summer Olympics
Olympic volleyball players of Brazil